3-Chloro-4-fluorophenylpiperazine (3,4-CFP, Kleferein) is a psychoactive drug of the phenylpiperazine class. It has been sold as a designer drug, first being identified in Poland in 2019.

See also 
 2,3-Dichlorophenylpiperazine
 2C-B-PP
 3C-PEP
 CPD-1
 Org 12962

References 

Chlorobenzenes
Phenylpiperazines